Catapausa bispinosa is a species of beetle in the family Cerambycidae. It was described by Per Olof Christopher Aurivillius in 1908 and is known from Papua New Guinea.

References

Homonoeini
Beetles described in 1908